A list of films produced by the Tollywood (Bengali language film industry) based in Kolkata in the year 2010.

Highest-grossing
 Dui Prithibi
 Shedin Dekha Hoyechilo
 Josh
 Amanush
 Bolo Na Tumi Aamar

A-Z of films

References

External links
 2010 films in Upperstall

2010
Lists of 2010 films by country or language
2010 in Indian cinema